The Aerotechnik WGM.21 is a quadrotor helicopter that was developed in the 1970s.

Design and development
The WGM.21 is an open cockpit quadrotor. Four rotors are mounted at the end of a four tubular supports arranged into a X shape. Cyclic and collective controls are mixed into a single control yoke. Pitch is controlled by foot pedals. A second model, the WGM.22, was developed with side-by-side configuration seating and an enclosed cockpit.

Variants
WGM.21
Single seat prototype
WGM.22
Two seat enclosed version

Aircraft on display
Hubschraubermuseum Bückeburg - prototype

Specifications (WGM.21)

References

Quadrotors